Kuddusi Özdemir (born 1956) is a Turkish wrestler. He competed in the men's freestyle 48 kg at the 1976 Summer Olympics.

References

External links
 

1956 births
Living people
Turkish male sport wrestlers
Olympic wrestlers of Turkey
Wrestlers at the 1976 Summer Olympics
Place of birth missing (living people)